Karel Vik was a Czech artist, painter and printmaker. He was born on 4 November 1883 at Hořice, and died on 8 October 1964 at Turnov. His works are held by museums across Europe.

References 

"Karel Vik was a Czech graphic artist , illustrator and painter . Between 1,902 - 1908 he studied landscape painting with Rudolf von Ottenfeld at the Academy of Fine Arts in Prague . Following the success of the graphic exhibition in Leipzig, he began creating graphics, a large part of his work consisted of woodcuts . In Prague, he co-founded Hollar . Soon he moved to Turnova , where he participated in the founding of Turnovské work (especially in conjunction with Karl Kinsky ). (..)  Since 1941 he was a member of the Czech Academy of Sciences and Arts" 

Karel Vik was a Czech visual artist who was born in 1883. Many works by the artist have been sold at auction, including 'House by the Golden Well' sold at Dorotheum, Prague 'Fine Art - Prague' in 2015. The artist died in 1964.

1883 births
1964 deaths
People from Hořice
People from the Kingdom of Bohemia
19th-century Czech painters
Czech male painters
20th-century Czech painters
Czech printmakers
20th-century printmakers
19th-century Czech male artists
20th-century Czech male artists